Pudsey is a market town in the City of Leeds Borough in West Yorkshire, England. It is located midway between Bradford city centre and Leeds city centre. Historically in the West Riding of Yorkshire, it has a population of 22,408.

History

The place-name Pudsey is first recorded in 1086 in the Domesday Book as Podechesai(e). Its etymology is rather uncertain: it seems most likely to derive from a putative personal name *Pudoc and the word ēg meaning 'island' but here presumably referring metaphorically to an 'island' of good ground in moorland. Thus the name would mean 'Pudoc's island'. Other possibilities have been suggested, however. In the early sixth century the district was in the Kingdom of Elmet, which seems to have retained its Celtic character for perhaps as many as two centuries after other neighbouring kingdoms had adopted the cultural identity of the Angles.

Around 1775, a cache of a 100 silver Roman coins, many predating the time of Julius Caesar, was found by Benjamin Scholfield of Pudsey on Pudsey Common, to the north of the town, at a place traditionally known as "King Alfred's Camp".

The town was famous in the 18th and 19th centuries for wool manufacture, and, from the 19th century, for cricket. Yorkshire and England cricketers Sir Len Hutton, Herbert Sutcliffe, Ray Illingworth and Matthew Hoggard all learned to play in Pudsey. A 19th century Yorkshire cricketer, John Tunnicliffe, was born in Lowtown.

During the Industrial Revolution, Pudsey was one of the most polluted areas of the UK due to its position in a slight valley between the two industrial cities of Leeds and Bradford. As a result, whichever way the wind blew Pudsey became covered in thick soot. The temperature inversion created by the valley led to the soot becoming trapped leading to dense smogs. This is believed to have led to jokes that pigeons in Pudsey Park flew backwards in order to keep the soot out of their eyes.

Governance
Formerly within the wapentake of Morley and Calverley Parish, Pudsey Urban District was formed in 1894; it gained municipal borough status . For many years, despite being joined to the Leeds conurbation, it avoided being made part of the County Borough of Leeds. In 1937 the Farsley and Calverley urban districts were added to Pudsey. In 1974, under the Local Government Act 1972, it became part of the metropolitan borough of the City of Leeds. It sits in the Leeds City Council ward of Pudsey.

Pudsey forms part of the Pudsey parliamentary constituency, along with Farsley, Calverley, Horsforth and Guiseley.  The Member of Parliament (MP) is Stuart Andrew.

Present

There are recreational parks in Pudsey, the largest of which is Pudsey Park. Queens Park is where the Pudsey carnival is held once a year.

Pudsey's market operates on Tuesday, Friday and Saturday and has recently been refurbished. Pudsey has a monthly farmers' market with stalls selling meat, fish, dairy produce, organic fruit and vegetables, delicatessen and craft-ware.

Pudsey town centre has amenities including high street chain stores and independent retailers, and there are several branches of banks and estate agents. Following the closure of Kwik Save supermarkets across the country, Pudsey's store was bought by Sainsbury's.  Until the administration of the group, Pudsey had a Woolworths on Church Lane.  It is now a B&M Home Bargains store.

There are three secondary schools situated within or near Pudsey: Crawshaw Academy, Co-op Academy Priesthorpe and Pudsey Grammar School. The latter has been rebuilt under an extensive redevelopment programme adjacent to the current site. The old grammar school building facing Richardshaw Lane, which opened in 1911 and a prominent landmark of Pudsey, will unlike the rest of the old school buildings not be demolished due to its listed building status, but has since been converted into flats.

Pudsey Town Hall benefits from a new, energy-efficient lighting project to highlight its most interesting features. The multi-coloured lights can be changed to offer 255 different scenes.

During the Easter weekend 2009, the Pudsey Business Forum launched the Pudsey Shop Local campaign. The campaign is to encourage local residents to shop more in Pudsey Town Centre. As part of this campaign they have launched a directory of all local shops.
Pudsey in Bloom was established in 2002.

Pudsey's business community introduced a Lottery Scheme, aimed at local shoppers. The lottery scheme, encourages shoppers to purchase tickets from local shops within the scheme. At the end of each month a draw takes place and prizes are paid out in Pudsey Pounds that can be spent in participating shops.

There are several pubs and clubs in and around the town centre including the Butcher's Arms, The Manor Inn, the Mason's Arms, the Shamrock Inn (now closed), the Crossed Shuttle, the World's End pub, the Britannia pub and (outside the town centre) the Troydale Recreational Club.

Pudsey has a Masonic community, there are Lodges which meet at Pudsey Masonic Hall on Church Lane. Locally these lodges support activities within the local community.

Next to the Masonic Hall on Church Lane is the former Unitarian Church, now a private residence known as Churchfield House.

Public transport

New Pudsey railway station is on the Caldervale Line between Leeds and Bradford Interchange. It was built as a "parkway" station, and is situated over a mile away from the town centre. The frequent no. 16 bus service between Pudsey and Farsley (continuing to Leeds) passes close to the station. The location of the station near to the junction of the main Leeds to Bradford road with the ring road provides easy access for those travelling to the station by car. There is a large car park adjacent to the station.

Pudsey bus station serves the town. The bus station is managed and operated by West Yorkshire Metro.  It is situated at Market Place and consists of six stands in total. Services are operated by Arriva Yorkshire. Connexionsbuses, First Leeds and HCT Group. The original bus station was replaced by a new structure that opened on 14 November 2010.  Metro and Leeds City Council re-built it in the style of similar bus stations in West Yorkshire.  Buses go from Pudsey to various parts of neighbouring Leeds, such as Armley, Bramley, Cross Gates, Farsley, Horsforth, Morley, Seacroft (a number of services run from the here to Seacroft bus station) and White Rose Centre, and as far afield as Dewsbury and Bradford.

Sport
The England cricket captain Sir Len Hutton was born in nearby Fulneck and was called "the man from Pudsey".  Raymond Illingworth, another former England cricket captain, was born in Pudsey as was the England fast bowler Matthew Hoggard and the snooker player Danny Fowler. For over a hundred years the Yorkshire County Cricket Club had at least one player who came from the old Borough of Pudsey. The England opening batsman Herbert Sutcliffe attended Pudsey School and learnt his cricket with the Pudsey St Lawrence and Pudsey Britannia cricket clubs.

Pudsey Runners running club was formed in 2013 and meet on Tuesdays and Thursdays at the Pudsey Bowling, Running and Table Tennis Club. The aim of the club is to get non-runners into running and improve their fitness as well as developing the abilities of experienced runners. Pudsey Pacers Running Club was established in 1991 and focuses on road, fell and trail running for all abilities. They also host the annual Pudsey 10K Challenge, a demanding and popular mixed surface race, incorporating on and off-road sections.

Cultural references
In The Meaning of Liff a Pudsey is defined as "The curious-shaped flat wads of dough left on a kitchen table after someone has been cutting scones out of it."
Toward the beginning of the Monty Python episode "You're No Fun Anymore", the two characters, Mr and Mrs Samuel Brainsample can be seen walking along the platform of New Pudsey railway station. Pudsey is also mentioned frequently in the Michael Palin TV series Ripping Yarns.

Pudsey has given its name to "Pudsey Bear", the mascot of the BBC's annual fundraising marathon Children in Need, as this was where Pudsey logo designer Joanna Lane's grandfather was mayor.

In bellringing Pudsey is one of the "Standard Eight" Surprise Major methods, the most commonly rung complex pieces of ringing for eight bells.

See also
Listed buildings in Pudsey

References

External links

This is Pudsey – Community website with local news, sport, events and local information
 YEP Pudsey Today Community Website
Calverley.info Pudsey & Calverley genealogical and historical data
Pudsey.com Pudsey Online Community Website.
BBC Children in Need
Pudsey Carnival
   The Ancient Parish of Calverley at GENUKI: Pudsey was in this parish

 
Towns in West Yorkshire
Places in Leeds
Market towns in West Yorkshire
Unparished areas in West Yorkshire